Dymares is a genus of sea snails, marine gastropod mollusks in the family Calliostomatidae within the superfamily Trochoidea, the top snails, turban snails and their allies.

Species
 Calliostoma (Astele) {Dymares} agalma Schwengel, 1942, a marine species occurring off Western Florida at a depth of 35 m. It is a synonym of Calliostoma yucatecanum Dall, 1881

References

 Schwengel, J. S. 1942. A new Floridan Calliostoma (Astele). Notulae Naturae 106: 1–2.

External links
 To World Register of Marine Species
 Malacolog 4.1.1. Calliostoma yucatecanum

 
Calliostomatidae
Monotypic gastropod genera